Johannes Steiniger (born 18 June 1987) is a German teacher and politician of the Christian Democratic Union (CDU) who has been serving as a member of the Bundestag from the state of Rhineland-Palatinate since 2013.

Political career

Early beginnings 
Steiniger joined the CDU in 2003. From 2010 until 2018, he served as chairman of the Young Union (JU) in Rhineland-Palatinate.

Member of the German Parliament, 2013–present 
Steiniger first became a member of the Bundestag in the 2013 German federal election, representing the Neustadt – Speyer district. He is a member of the Finance Committee and the Sports Committee. On the Finance Committee, he is his parliamentary group's rapporteur on climate protection. From 2020 until 2021, he was also involved in the parliamentary inquiry into the Wirecard scandal.

Other activities 
 Sparkasse Rhein Haardt, Member of the supervisory board (since 2019)
 Federal Agency for Civic Education (BPB), Alternate Member of the Board of Trustees

Political positions 
In June 2017, Steiniger voted against his parliamentary group's majority and in favor of Germany's introduction of same-sex marriage.

Ahead of the Christian Democrats’ leadership election, Steiniger publicly endorsed in 2020 Friedrich Merz to succeed Annegret Kramp-Karrenbauer as the party's chair. For the 2021 national elections, he later endorsed Markus Söder as the Christian Democrats' joint candidate to succeed Chancellor Angela Merkel.

Controversy 
In 2014, Steiniger led efforts to remove fellow politician Sven Heibel from the board of the JU in Rhineland-Palatinate after Heibel causing national outrage by calling for the partial reintroduction of criminal liability for homosexuality.

References

External links 

  
 Bundestag biography 

1987 births
Living people
Members of the Bundestag for Rhineland-Palatinate
Members of the Bundestag 2021–2025
Members of the Bundestag 2017–2021
Members of the Bundestag 2013–2017
Members of the Bundestag for the Christian Democratic Union of Germany